Somaya Yehia Ramadan is an Egyptian academic, translator and writer. She was born in Cairo in 1951 and studied English at Cairo University. Subsequently, she obtained a PhD in English from Trinity College, Dublin in 1983. She is a convert from Islam to the Baháʼí Faith.

Ramadan's first two books were short story collections: Khashab wa Nohass (Brass and Wood, 1995) and Manazel el-Kamar (Phases of the Moon, 1999). Her first novel Awraq Al-Nargis (Leaves of Narcissus) was published to great acclaim in 2001 and won the Naguib Mahfouz Medal. It was then translated into English by Marilyn Booth and is available from the AUC Press.

Ramadan has also worked extensively as a translator. Among her notable translations is Virginia Woolf's A Room of One's Own. She is a founding member of the Women and Memory Forum, a non-profit organisation, and teaches English and Translation at the National Academy of Arts in Cairo.

Biography
Ramadan was born in 1951 in Cairo, Egypt. In 2001, her novel Leaves of Narcissus won the Naguib Mahfouz Medal for Literature.

Literary works
Ramadan's works include:
 Leaves of Narcissus
Ṭarīq al-mustaqbal : ruʼyah Bahāʼīyah'''Khashab wa-nuḥās Manazil al-qamar''

Bibliography

References

External links 

 Egypt's forgotten minorities fear for future

1951 births
Living people
Converts to the Bahá'í Faith from Islam
Egyptian Bahá'ís
Egyptian novelists
Egyptian women short story writers
Egyptian short story writers
Egyptian women writers
Academics from Cairo
Recipients of the Naguib Mahfouz Medal for Literature
20th-century Bahá'ís
21st-century Bahá'ís
Egyptian expatriates in Ireland